Dey, from the Turkish honorific title dayı, literally meaning uncle, was the title given to the rulers of the Regency of Algiers (Algeria), Tripoli, and Tunis under the Ottoman Empire from 1671 onwards. Twenty-nine deys held office from the establishment of the deylicate in Algeria until the French conquest in 1830.

The dey was chosen by local civilian, military, and religious leaders to govern for life and ruled with a high degree of autonomy from the Ottoman sultan. The main sources of his revenues were taxes on the agricultural population, religious tributes, and protection payments rendered by Corsairs, regarded as pirates who preyed on Mediterranean shipping. In the European part of the Ottoman Empire, in particular during its decline, leaders of the outlawed janissary and yamak troops sometimes acquired title of Dahi or Dahia, which is derived from Dey.

The dey was assisted in governing made up of the Chiefs of the Army and Navy, the Director of Shipping, the Treasurer-General and the Collector of Tributes.

The realm of the dey of Alger (Algiers) was divided into three provinces (Constantine, Titteri and Mascara), each of which was administered by a bey (باي) whom he appointed.

The rule of the deys of Alger came to an end on 5 July 1830, when Hussein Dey (1765–1838) surrendered to invading French forces.

The last Dey of Tripoli was killed by Ahmed Karamanli, who established the eponymous Karamanli dynasty in 1711.

Deys of Tunis

See also
 List of Pashas and Deys of Algiers
 List of Pashas and Deys of Tripoli
 Baig
 Bey

Sources

References

External links

 
Titles of national or ethnic leadership
Ottoman Algeria
Barbary Wars
Turkish words and phrases
Ottoman titles
Ottoman Tripolitania
Ottoman Tunisia